Chateau is a North Side neighborhood in Downtown Pittsburgh, Pennsylvania. It has representation on Pittsburgh City Council by the council member for District 6 (North Shore/Downtown Neighborhoods). It is on the banks of the Ohio River and is separated from the neighborhood of Manchester by PA Route 65.

As of the 2000 U.S. Census, Chateau has a population of 39. A 2006 investigation by the Pittsburgh Post-Gazette found the neighborhood virtually uninhabited.  This may be because the neighborhood mostly consists of warehouses and places of business along the Ohio River.

In August 2009, the Rivers Casino opened along the Ohio River in the Chateau neighborhood.  The Carnegie Science Center and the Manchester Craftsmen's Guild are also located in Chateau. Chateau has a zip code of 15233.

Surrounding and adjacent Pittsburgh neighborhoods
Chateau has four land borders with the Pittsburgh neighborhoods of Manchester to the north and north-northeast,  
Allegheny West to the northeast, North Shore to the east, and Marshall-Shadeland to the northwest.  Across the Ohio River, Chateau runs adjacent with the Pittsburgh neighborhoods of (from northwest to southeast) Esplen, Elliott, West End Valley (with direct link via West End Bridge) and the South Shore

See also
 List of Pittsburgh neighborhoods

References

Gallery

External links

Interactive Pittsburgh Neighborhoods Map

Neighborhoods in Pittsburgh
Redeveloped ports and waterfronts in the United States